The 1899–1900 Princeton Tigers men's ice hockey season was the inaugural season of play for the program.

Season
Princeton joined the Intercollegiate Hockey Association, replacing the spot previously held by Pennsylvania. While the Tigers did not win any games they were competitive in several and the team got progressively better as the year went along.

Roster

Standings

Schedule and Results

|-
!colspan=12 style=";" | Regular Season

Scoring Statistics

Note: Assists were not recorded as a statistic.

References

Princeton Tigers men's ice hockey seasons
Princeton
Princeton
Princeton
Princeton